The Michigan State Spartans men's ice hockey team is the college ice hockey team that represents Michigan State University (MSU). The team plays at the Munn Ice Arena in East Lansing, Michigan, on the MSU campus. The current head coach is Adam Nightingale, who took over coaching duties on May 3, 2022, after Danton Cole was fired. Michigan State currently competes in the Big Ten Conference.

The MSU ice hockey program has seven CCHA regular season championships and 11 CCHA Tournament titles.  MSU has also won 12 Great Lakes Invitational titles.  The Spartans have been in the NCAA tournament 23 times, with nine Frozen Four appearances and three national titles (1966, 1986, and 2007). On April 7, 2007, the Michigan State Spartans won their third National Championship by beating Boston College 3–1.  Their traditional rival is Michigan and the teams have played an annual game in Detroit since 1990. Starting at the Joe Louis Arena, the game has since moved to Little Caesars Arena in 2018.

History

Early history
The Spartan ice hockey program traces its roots back to the first informal varsity team that began in 1922 playing an independent NCAA Division I schedule. On January 11, 1922, Michigan State played its first intercollegiate hockey game, a 1–5 loss to Michigan. Home games during the first season were played on the frozen Red Cedar River on MSU's campus.

Michigan State finished 0–3 in the 1922 season and picked up its first win during the second season on February 11, 1923, 6–1 over the Lansing Independents. The team did not play the 1923–24 season but returned for the 1924–25 season. The 1924–25 season marked the first time the program had a head coach, John Kobs, who also coached the Michigan State Spartans baseball team. Kobs' tenure at Michigan State lasted six season before the team was suspended for 19 seasons. During which time the team compiled a record of 8-18-1.

Harold Paulsen was hired as the varsity ice hockey coach at Michigan State on August 1, 1948 following the suspension of the hockey programs during the years of the Great Depression and World War II. Before recruiting or coaching, Paulsen oversaw the renovation of Demonstration Hall into an indoor rink with artificial ice-making capabilities. On January 12, 1950, MSU played its first game since 1930, losing to Michigan Tech 6–2. Paulsen struggled through his first two years at Michigan State with a 6–25 record. MSU athletic director Ralph Young felt the hockey program's progress was inadequate and Paulsen resigned.  Following the 1951 season, Amo Bessone accepted the head coaching position at Michigan State University. Bessone would remain at MSU for the next 28 years.

Amo Bessone era
When Bessone arrived at Michigan State, the ice hockey program was beginning its third full season after being reinstated. That same season, in 1951–52, the Spartans joined Colorado College, Denver, Michigan, Michigan Tech, Minnesota, and North Dakota as founding members of the Midwest Collegiate Hockey League (MCHL).

Amo Bessone won his first collegiate hockey game as head coach on November 29, 1951, when the Spartans defeated Ontario Agricultural College 8–2. The Spartans struggled with six losing seasons before Bessone turned things around in his seventh season as coach. In 1957–58, Michigan State enjoyed its first winning season. The following season, Bessone guided MSU to a Big Ten championship and a berth in the NCAA tournament. The tournament was MSU's first NCAA tournament appearance. The Spartans defeated Boston College 4–3 in the semifinals and advanced to the schools's first championship appearance. The Spartans lost the 1959 national championship game in overtime 3–4 to North Dakota. MSU finishes the season 17-6-1. Michigan State became a charter member of the Western Collegiate Hockey Association (WCHA) in 1959. The WCHA was a reincarnation of the loosely affiliated Midwest Collegiate Hockey League and Western Intercollegiate Hockey League that disbanded following the 1957–58 season. Bessone and MSU struggled during the first five seasons of the WCHA. Again, Bessone turned things around with a winning season in 1964–65. The following season, Bessone coached Michigan State to an improbable NCAA National Championship.

MSU began the 1965–66 season 4-10, but rebounded winning 12 of their last 15 games including defeating the defending national champion, Michigan Tech, to win the WCHA playoffs after finishing sixth in the regular season. The win earned MSU a spot in the 1966 NCAA tournament. In the national semifinals, Bessone upset highly favored Boston University 2–1 with a goal by Spartan forward, Doug Volmar. In the national championship game, Bessone and the Spartans faced Len Ceglarski's Clarkson team that owned the national-best record of 24–2. On March 19, 1966, Michigan State beat top-ranked Clarkson 6–1 victory to give Michigan State is first national championship. Len Ceglarski and Amo Bessone shared the Spencer Penrose Award as the national coach of the year in 1966. The national title and coaching award cemented Bessone's legacy as a coach. To this day, Bessone's 1966 Michigan State team remains one of the biggest underdog stories in NCAA ice hockey history. The total number of team victories (16) and team winning percentage (.551) is the lowest of any NCAA ice hockey champion. MSU made the NCAA tournament again with a strong WCHA playoff finish in 1967, but lost 2–4 in the national semifinals, a rematch of the 1966 NCAA Tournament against Boston University.

Bessone began the 1970s with six straight winning seasons. During Bessone's time coaching the Spartans the team won MSU won its first Great Lakes Invitational by defeating Michigan Tech 5–4 on December 28, 1973.

As MSU hockey was building momentum, Munn Ice Arena opened October 25, 1974, when Michigan State hosted Laurentian. That same season saw the first sellout crowd in Munn's history when the Spartans defeated North Dakota 6–2. A season later, in 1975–76, Bessone guided MSU to its best WCHA conference record of 20-12-0 before Minnesota knocked MSU out of the WCHA playoffs in 6-7 triple overtime loss. Minnesota, who had finished below Michigan State in the conference, received an NCAA tournament bid instead. Bessone announced his retirement effective at the end of the 1978–79 season after three straight losing seasons. Bessone coached his final game as head coach on March 3, 1979, when the Spartans defeated rival Michigan 5–3.

Ron Mason era

After Amo Bessone retired from Michigan State University, the MSU Athletic Director, Joseph Kearney, hired Ron Mason as the Spartans new head coach. Mason was named Spartan head coach on April 1, 1979, and spend the next 23 seasons at Michigan State. It was a rough start in the Western Collegiate Hockey Association for Mason as he compiled a record of 26-46-2 over two seasons. Michigan State joined the Central Collegiate Hockey Association (CCHA) in 1981 and over the next few seasons Mason turned the hockey program around. The Spartans won CCHA playoff championships the first four straight seasons of the conference in 1982, 1983, 1984, 1985. MSU would win a second national title in 1986 when the Spartans defeated Harvard 6–5.

In 2000 CCHA coaches and athletic directors unanimous voted to renamed the CCHA championship trophy to the Mason Cup in honor of Ron Mason, who was a key figure in establishing the conference in the early 1970s prior to his tenure at Michigan State. During the 2000–01 season Michigan State finished first in the regular season and advanced through the CCHA Tournament winning the first ever Mason Cup. That same season the Spartans made a Frozen Four appearance by beating Wisconsin 5-1 before losing to North Dakota in the Semifinal game. On October 6, 2001, the Spartans hosted an outdoor game at Spartan Stadium against rival Michigan known as The Cold War. The school would set an attendance record for an outdoor hockey game as 74,554 fans attended. The game ended in a 3–3 tie.

Mason led Michigan State to seven CCHA regular season titles and a conference-record 10 CCHA tournament titles. In addition, MSU under Mason made 19 NCAA tournament appearances during his 23 seasons with the Spartans. He coached MSU to five NCAA Frozen Fours, two National Championship appearances, and one National Championship. Mason coached two Hobey Baker Memorial Award winners, Kip Miller in 1990 and Ryan Miller in 2001.

Rick Comley era

Rick Comley was announced as Ron Mason's successor as head ice hockey coach at Michigan State University in March 2002. Comley led the Spartans to a tournament appearance in 2004, his second season as MSU's head coach. After losing to Northern Michigan in the 2004 CCHA Tournament the Spartans received an at-large bid to the 2004 NCAA Tournament. Third ranked MSU fell to second seed Minnesota-Duluth in the opening round 0–5.

Comley's Spartans returned to the NCAA Tournament in 2006 after missing the NCAA Tournament in 2005. Comley guided MSU to a second-place CCHA finish in the regular season and a CCHA Mason Cup Championship in 2006. Michigan State advanced into the 2006 Tournament with an automatic bid. The Spartans defeated New Hampshire 1-0 before losing to Maine 4–5 in the East Regional Final.

In the 2006–07 season, Michigan State was preseason ranked No. 5, which was MSU's highest preseason ranking since October 2001. The team earned an NCAA Tournament bid after finishing the regular season with a conference record of 15-10-3. Comley led MSU to defeat three higher-ranked teams en route to the national championship including No. 1-ranked Notre Dame in the Midwest Regional final. In the Frozen Four the team defeated No. 4-ranked Boston College in the National Championship game on April 7, 2007, by a score of 3–1 in a game that saw Michigan State score three unanswered goals in the third period.

In December 2010 the Michigan State Spartans and Michigan Wolverines played a second outdoor game at Michigan Stadium. The game, known as The Big Chill at the Big House, took place on December 11, 2010. 104,173 fans filled Michigan Stadium and watched as Michigan beat Michigan State 5–0. The attendance broke the 75,000 of the Cold War and 78,000 of the 2010 IIHF World Championship and set a new attendance record for a hockey game. Later that same season on January 25, 2011, Rick Comley announced that he would retire at the conclusion of the 2010–11 season.

Tom Anastos and Big Ten Conference era 

In September 2010 Penn State University announced that the university was elevating its men's and women's American Collegiate Hockey Association club programs to varsity status. Then-CCHA commissioner Tom Anastos publicly stated that the CCHA would strongly consider adding Penn State as the conference's 12th member. On March 21, 2011, the Big Ten Conference announced plans to sponsor men's ice hockey starting in 2013–14 season. Michigan State along with CCHA rivals, University of Michigan and Ohio State University will leave the CCHA to join University of Minnesota and the University of Wisconsin from the WCHA and Penn State to form a six-team Big Ten Hockey Conference. Less than a week after the Big Ten's announcement Michigan State announced that former CCHA Commissioner, Tom Anastos would become the 6th head coach in the history of the program. Anastos is a former Spartan hockey player who played for MSU from 1981 to 1985. He is also the former coach at Michigan-Dearborn (NAIA) from 1987 to 1990, and compiled a 68-37-7 record. He later served as an assistant coach under Ron Mason from 1990 to 1992.

Anastos picked up his first NCAA DI coaching victory with Michigan State in the second game of the 2012 Icebreaker tournament with a 3–2 overtime win over Air Force. The Spartans finished the 2011–12 season ranked 5th in the CCHA standings and received a first round bye in the CCHA Tournament. The Spartans faced fourth-seeded Miami (OH) in the second round, in the best-of-three series Michigan State was swept 0-6 and 1–4 in two games. Despite being swept by Miami, the Spartans finished 15th in the Pairwise rankings and became the final at-large bid selected for the 2012 NCAA Tournament. The bid marked the team's first appearance in the NCAA post-season since 2008, the team was placed in the East Region held at Webster Bank Arena in Bridgeport, Connecticut. In the game, Union College took an early lead and held the Spartans to a single goal in a 3–1 win over Michigan State in the East Regional semifinal. The game was the first meeting between the two programs and also the first win in the NCAA Division I national tournament for the Dutchmen.

At the end of the 2016–17 season, it was announced that Tom Anastos would step down as head coach of the Spartans. MSU then announced that they had hired Danton Cole as the program's 7th head coach.

Danton Cole era
On April 11, 2017, Danton Cole was named head coach at Michigan State University. In Cole first season, 2017–18, the Spartans finished last in the Big Ten and were swept in a three-game series in the conference tournament by Ohio State. The next season, MSU once again finished last in the Big Ten and were swept by Notre Dame in the conference tournament. In 2019–20, the Spartans started the season strong and swept Michigan for the first time in Cole's tenure. However, the performances fell off and they finished sixth in the conference before being swept by Michigan in the Big Ten Tournament.

On April 12, 2022, he was fired by Michigan State. During five seasons as head coach, he led the Spartans to a 58–101–12 record.

Adam Nightingale era
On May 3, 2022, Adam Nightingale was named head coach at Michigan State University.

Season-by-season results

Source:

Coaches
As of the end of the 2021–22 season

All-time coaching records
Source:

Awards and honors

United States Hockey Hall of Fame
Source:

Ron Mason (2013)

NCAA

Individual awards

Hobey Baker Award
Kip Miller: 1990
Ryan Miller: 2001

Spencer Penrose Award
Amo Bessone: 1966
Ron Mason: 1992

NCAA Scoring Champion
Steve Colp: 1974
Tom Ross: 1975, 1976
Bobby Reynolds: 1989
Kip Miller: 1989, 1990
Taro Hirose: 2019

Tournament Most Outstanding Player
Gaye Cooley: 1966
Mike Donnelly: 1986
Justin Abdelkader: 2007

All-Americans
AHCA First Team All-Americans

1958-59: Joe Selinger, G
1961-62: John Chandik, G
1963-64: Carl Lackey, D
1964-65: Doug Roberts, F
1965-66: Doug Volmar, F
1968-69: Rick Duffett, G
1970-71: Don Thompson, F
1971-72: Jim Watt, G
1972-73: Bob Boyd, D
1973-74: Norm Barnes, D; Steve Colp, F
1974-75: Tom Ross, F
1975-76: Tom Ross, F
1981-82: Ron Scott, G
1982-83: Ron Scott, G
1984-85: Dan McFall, D; Kelly Miller, F; Craig Simpson, F
1985-86: Mike Donnelly, F
1986-87: Mitch Messier, F
1988-89: Kip Miller, F; Bobby Reynolds, F
1989-90: Kip Miller, F
1990-91: Jason Woolley, D
1991-92: Joby Messier, D; Dwayne Norris, F
1992-93: Bryan Smolinski, F
1997-98: Chad Alban, G; Mike York, F
1998-99: Joe Blackburn, G; Mike York, F
1999-00: Shawn Horcoff, F
2000-01: Ryan Miller, G
2001-02: Ryan Miller, G
2002-03: John-Michael Liles, D
2011-12: Torey Krug, D
2014-15: Jake Hildebrand, G
2018-19: Taro Hirose, F

AHCA Second Team All-Americans

1983-84: Dan McFall, D
1984-85: Gary Haight, D
1985-86: Donald McSween, D
1986-87: Donald McSween, D
1989-90: Jason Muzzatti, G
1991-92: Doug Zmolek, D
1993-94: Steve Guolla, F
1994-95: Anson Carter, F
1997-98: Tyler Harlton, D; Sean Berens, F
1998-99: Mike Weaver, F
1999-00: Mike Weaver, F
2001-02: Andrew Hutchinson, D; John-Michael Liles, D
2002-03: Brad Fast, D
2003-04: A. J. Thelen, D; Jim Slater, F
2007-08: Jeff Lerg, G
2009-10: Jeff Petry, D

WCHA

Individual awards

Most Valuable Player
Tom Ross, C: 1975

Sophomore of the Year
Don Thompson, F: 1970

Freshman of the Year
Ron Scott, G: 1981

All-Conference Teams
First Team All-WCHA

1965–66: Doug Volmar, F
1966–67: Tom Mikkola, F
1970–71: Don Thompson, F
1971–72: Jim Watt, G
1972–73: Bob Boyd, D
1973–74: Norm Barnes, D; Steve Colp, F
1974–75: Tom Ross, F
1975–76: Tom Ross, F
1980–81: Ron Scott, G

Second Team All-WCHA

1957–58: Joe Selinger, G
1963–64: Carl Lackey, G
1964–65: Doug Roberts, G
1971–72: Bob Boyd, D; Don Thompson, F
1973–74: Tom Ross, F
1975–76: Steve Colp, F

CCHA

Individual awards

Player of the Year
Kip Miller, LW: 1990
Dwayne Norris, D: 1992
Chad Alban, G: 1998
Mike York, C: 1999
Shawn Horcoff, C: 2000
Ryan Miller, G: 2001
Ryan Miller, G: 2002
Torey Krug, D: 2012

Best Defensive Forward
Mike York, C: 1999
Shawn Horcoff, C: 2000
John Nail, RW: 2001
Drew Miller, LW: 2006
Justin Abdelkader, C: 2008

Best Defensive Defenseman
Joby Messier: 1992
Tyler Harlton: 1997, 1998
Mike Weaver: 1999, 2000
Andrew Hutchinson: 2001
Brad Fast: 2003

Best Offensive Defenseman
Jason Woolley: 1991
John-Michael Liles: 2002, 2003
A. J. Thelen: 2004
Torey Krug: 2011, 2012

Best Goaltender
Ryan Miller: 2001, 2002
Dominic Vicari: 2004
Scott Borek: 2000

Coach of the Year
Ron Mason: 1985, 1989, 1990, 1999

Perani Cup
Jeff Lerg, G: 2007
Drew Palmisano, G: 2010

Scholar-Athlete of the Year
Jeff Lerg, G: 2008

Terry Flanagan Memorial Award
Wes McCauley, D: 1993
Jon Gaskins, D: 1996
Bryan Adams, LW: 1998
Brian Maloney, LW: 2003

Best Defensive Forward
Bill Shibicky, F: 1984
Joe Murphy, RW: 1986
Rod Brind'Amour, C: 1989
Jeff Lerg, G: 2006

Ilitch Humanitarian Award
Drew Miller, LW: 2006
Justin Abdelkader, C: 2008
Jeff Lerg, G: 2009
Trevor Nill, C: 2011

Tournament Most Valuable Player
Ron Scott, G: 1982
Norm Foster, G: 1985
Bobby Reynolds, RW: 1987
Jason Muzzatti, G: 1989
Peter White, C: 1990
Mike York, C: 1998
Ryan Miller, G: 2000, 2001
Jeff Lerg, G: 2006

All-Conference Teams
First Team All-CCHA

1981–82: Ron Scott, G; Newell Brown, F
1982–83: Ron Scott, G; Ken Leiter, D
1983–84: Dan McFall, D
1984–85: Bob Essensa, G; Gary Haight, D; Donald McSween, D; Craig Simpson, F; Kelly Miller, F
1985–86: Donald McSween, D; Mike Donnelly, F
1986–87: Donald McSween, D; Mitch Messier, F
1987–88: Tim Tilley, D
1988–89: Kip Miller, F
1989–90: Jason Muzzatti, G; Kip Miller, F
1990–91: Jason Woolley, D
1991–92: Joby Messier, D; Dwayne Norris, F
1992–93: Bryan Smolinski, F
1993–94: Anson Carter, F
1994–95: Anson Carter, F
1997–98: Chad Alban, G; Tyler Harlton, D; Sean Berens, F
1998–99: Mike Weaver, D; Mike York, F
1999–00: Mike Weaver, D; Shawn Horcoff, F
2000–01: Ryan Miller, G
2001–02: Ryan Miller, G; John-Michael Liles, D
2002–03: Brad Fast, D; John-Michael Liles, D; Jim Slater, F
2003–04: A. J. Thelen, D; Jim Slater, F
2007–08: Jeff Lerg, G
2010–11: Torey Krug, D
2011–12: Torey Krug, D

Second Team All-CCHA

1981–82: Gary Haight, D; Mark Hamway, F
1982–83: Gary Haight, D
1983–84: Norm Foster, G
1984–85: Dan McFall, D; Tom Anastos, F
1985–86: Bob Essensa, G
1986–87: Bill Shibicky, F
1987–88: Jason Muzzatti, G; Bobby Reynolds, F
1988–89: Chris Luongo, D; Bobby Reynolds, F
1989–90: Don Gibson, D; Pat Murray, F
1990–91: Mike Gilmore, G
1993–94: Mike Buzak, G; Steve Guolla, F
1994–95: Mike Buzak, G; Rem Murray, F
1995–96: Anson Carter, F
1996–97: Sean Berens, F
1997–98: Mike York, F
1998–99: Joe Blackburn, G
1999–00: Ryan Miller, G; Adam Hall, F
2000–01: Andrew Hutchinson, D; John-Michael Liles, D
2001–02: Andrew Hutchinson, D
2007–08: Tim Kennedy, F
2008–09: Jeff Lerg, G
2009–10: Drew Palmisano, G; Jeff Petry, D; Corey Tropp, F

CCHA All-Rookie Team

1988–89: Jason Woolley, D; Rod Brind'Amour, F; Peter White, F
1991–92: Rem Murray, F; Steve Suk, F
1995–96: Chris Bogas, D; Mike York, F
1997–98: Rustyn Dolyny, F
1998–99: Adam Hall, F
1999–00: Ryan Miller, G
2001–02: Jim Slater, F
2002–03: David Booth, F
2003–04: Dominic Vicari, G; A. J. Thelen, D
2005–06: Jeff Lerg, G
2007–08: Jeff Petry, D
2009–10: Torey Krug, D

Big Ten

Individual awards

Player of the Year
Jake Hildebrand, G: 2015
Taro Hirose, F: 2019

Goaltender of the Year
Jake Hildebrand, G: 2015

Freshman of the Year
Mitchell Lewandowski, F: 2018

Scoring Champion
Taro Hirose, F: 2019

All-Conference Teams
First Team All-Big Ten

2014–15: Jake Hildebrand, G
2018–19: Taro Hirose, F

Second Team All-Big Ten

2014–15: Travis Walsh, D
2017–18: Taro Hirose, F
2018–19: Patrick Khodorenko, F

Big Ten All-Rookie Team

2014–15: Josh Jacobs, D
2015–16: Zach Osburn, D
2017–18: Mitchell Lewandowski, F
2018–19: Dennis Cesana, D; Drew DeRidder, G

Statistical leaders

Source:

Career points leaders

Career goaltending leaders

GP = Games played; Min = Minutes played; W = Wins; L = Losses; T = Ties; GA = Goals against; SO = Shutouts; SV% = Save percentage; GAA = Goals against average

Minimum 30 games

Statistics current through the start of the 2020–21 season.

Olympians
This is a list of Michigan State alumni were a part of an Olympic team.

Players

Current roster 
As of July 11, 2022.

Spartans in the NHL
As of July 1, 2022.

Source:

Program records
The following are the Michigan State school records. Statistics are accurate as of the 2010–11 season.

Note: Italics indicate a player is still an active Spartan.

Career
Most goals in a career: 138 Tom Ross (1972–76)
Most assists in a career: 186 Tom Ross (1972–76)
Most points in a career: 324 Tom Ross (1972–76)
Most penalty minutes in a career: 466 Don Gibson (1986–90)
Most points in a career, defenseman: 164 Steve Beadle (1986–90)
Most wins in a career: 83 Jason Muzzatti (1987–91)
Most shutouts in a career: Ryan Miller
Most healthy scratches in a career: 48 David Bondra (2012–16)

Season

Players
Most goals in a season: 59 Mike Donnelly 1985-86
Most assists in a season: 60 Pat Murray 1989-90
Most points in a season: 105 Tom Ross 1975-76
Most penalty minutes in a season: 167 Don Gibson 1989-90
Most points in a season, defenseman: 64 Norm Barnes (1973–74)
Most points in a season, rookie:
Most wins in a season: 32 Jason Muzzatti (1988–89)
Most shutouts in a season: 4 Joe Selinger (1958–59)
Most power play goals in a season (since 1975):

Team (since 1950)
Most wins in a season: 38 1984-85
Most WCHA wins in a season: 20 1975-76
Most overtime games in a season: 11 (1991–92; 1986–87)
Longest overall unbeaten streak: 22 (Dec. 29, 1984-Feb. 15, 1985)

Game

Player
Most goals in a game: 5, Mike Donnelly vs. Ohio State (Dec. 14, 1985), Tom Ross vs. Notre Dame (Nov. 10, 1973), Don Thompson vs. Michigan (Feb 21, 1970), Bob Doyle vs. Ohio (Feb. 17, 1961)
Most assists in a game: 6, Steve Colp vs. Michigan (Dec. 14, 1974), Daryl Rice vs. Boston College (Dec. 27, 1973), Real Turcotte vs. Ohio (Feb. 17, 1961)
Most points in a game: 9, Bob Doyle vs. Ohio (Feb. 17, 1961), Real Turcotte vs. Ohio (Feb. 17, 1961)
Most penalty minutes in a game: 21, Tony Tuzzolino vs. Western Michigan (Oct. 19, 1996)

Team
Most goals in a game: 18 vs. Ohio State (Dec. 7, 1957)
Most goals in a period: 8 vs. Ohio State (Dec. 7, 1957, 3rd)
Most assists in a period: 14 vs. Ferris State (March 3, 1990, 2nd)
Most penalty minutes in a game: 60 vs. Northeastern (Oct. 15, 1983)
Most penalty minutes in a period: 53 vs. Ferris State (Dec. 16, 1988, 2nd)

See also
Michigan State Spartans

References

External links

 

 
Ice hockey teams in Michigan
Big Ten Conference ice hockey